José Antonio (Chourio) Ortega (born October 12, 1988) is a Venezuelan former professional baseball pitcher. He has played for the Detroit Tigers in Major League Baseball (MLB).

Career

2012: Debut with Tigers
Ortega was called up to the Major Leagues by the Detroit Tigers in June 2012. He made his Major League debut on June 8, 2012 against the Cincinnati Reds giving up two hits in  innings pitched. After the game, Ortega was sent back down to minor league Triple-A Toledo Mud Hens.

2013
Ortega started the 2013 season with the Mud Hens where he went 1–0 with a 0.00 ERA in 14 innings pitched before being called up by the Tigers on April 29.

2014
Ortega was called up again on April 26, 2014 to add a fresh arm after the bullpen was heavily used that week. He had to be used right away when starter Aníbal Sánchez came out of the game in the 3rd inning. Ortega gave up four runs over 1 innings without giving up a hit, while allowing five walks. He was optioned back to the Mud Hens on May 6, 2014 to make room for Robbie Ray. On August 29, 2014, he was designated for assignment by the Detroit Tigers. From June 19 on, Ortega had a 4.78 ERA and a .406 OBP against with the Mud Hens.

Colorado Rockies
Ortega signed a minor league deal with the Colorado Rockies on November 22, 2014.

Vaqueros Laguna
On April 1, 2016, Ortega signed with the Vaqueros Laguna of the Mexican Baseball League. He was released on April 10, 2016.

Sioux Falls Canaries
On April 20, 2017, Ortega signed with the Sioux Falls Canaries of the American Association of Independent Professional Baseball.

Sugar Land Skeeters
On January 9, 2018, Ortega was traded to the Sugar Land Skeeters of the Atlantic League of Professional Baseball. He was released on May 7, 2018.

Road Warriors
On May 9, 2018, Ortega signed with the Road Warriors of the Atlantic League of Professional Baseball. He became a free agent following the 2018 season.

York Revolution
On February 26, 2019, Ortega signed with the York Revolution of the Atlantic League of Professional Baseball. He was released on May 6, 2019.

Lincoln Saltdogs
On June 4, 2019, Ortega signed with the Lincoln Saltdogs of the American Association. He was released on June 18, 2019.

References

External links

1988 births
Living people
Baseball pitchers
Detroit Tigers players
Erie SeaWolves players
Lakeland Flying Tigers players
Oneonta Tigers players
Toledo Mud Hens players
Venezuelan expatriate baseball players in the United States
West Michigan Whitecaps players
Venezuelan Summer League Tigers players
Navegantes del Magallanes players
New Britain Rock Cats players
Major League Baseball pitchers
Tigres de Aragua players
Sugar Land Skeeters players
York Revolution players
Lincoln Saltdogs players